The Basketball Champions League (BCL), also known as the FIBA Champions League, is an annual professional basketball competition for European clubs, organised by FIBA. It is the top-level competition organised by FIBA Europe, therefore the champion participates in the  FIBA Intercontinental Cup.  

Clubs qualify for the competition based on their performance in their national leagues and cup competitions. Although exceptional, some teams can be wildcarded.

Creation and adoption

In October 2015, FIBA attempted to take back control of Europe's top-tier club competition, by proposing a new competition, featuring 16 teams playing in a round-robin format, and granting eight guaranteed spots to different clubs. When top European clubs decided to maintain the same competition format, keeping organization within Euroleague Basketball, FIBA announced launch of a new European basketball club competition, with qualification based on sporting merit.

Format

Tournament
The tournament proper begins with a regular season of 32 teams, divided into four groups. Seeding is used in the draw for this stage, and teams from the same country may not be drawn into groups together. Each team meets the others in its group in home and away games, in a round-robin format. The top four teams from each group then progress to the play-offs. The fifth and sixth-placed teams can choose to enter the FIBA Europe Cup playoffs in the same season.

The regular season is played from October to January, and the playoffs start in February. In the round of 16 and quarter-finals, ties are played in a 'home and away' format, based on aggregate scores. For the round of 16, the winning team from one group plays against the fourth-placed team from another group and the runner-up from one group plays against the third-placed team from another group. For the quarter-finals, the winners of games between the group winners and fourth-placed teams play against the winners from the runners-up and third-placed teams. The Final Four is typically held in the final week of April or the first week of May.

Arena rules
Currently, the minimum seating capacity for home arenas of the clubs that compete in the Basketball Champions League (BCL) is 3,000 seats. However, the Basketball Champions League organizing body has the authority to grant clubs with smaller arenas a waiver of the rule.

Prizes

Trophy
Each year, the winning team is presented with the Basketball Champions League Trophy. It was designed by Radiant Studios and crafted by Thomas Lyte. A basketball net forms the focus of the trophy, and the design creates the effect of a crown.

Prize money
From 2016–17 to 2017–18, FIBA reduced the prize money from €5,200,000 to €3,500,000, but doubled the prize for the winner from €500,000 to €1,000,000. As of 2017–18, FIBA awards a base fee of €50,000 for reaching the regular season. In addition, FIBA pays teams reaching the round of 16 €20,000, each quarter-finalist €30,000, €40,000 for the fourth-placed team, €100,000 for the third-placed team, €300,000 for the runners-up, and €900,000 for the winners.

Base fee for the regular season: €50,000
Round of 16: €70,000
Quarter-finals: €100,000
4th placed team: €140,000
3rd placed team: €200,000
Losing finalist: €400,000
Winning the Final: €1,000,000

Results

Performances by club

A total of 93 clubs from 27 national associations have played in or qualified for the Champions League group stage.

Broadcasting rights

Awards

Winning rosters

Youth competition 
In January 2023, the Basketball Champions League launched its under-18 competition named the "Youth Basketball Champions League". The inaugural season will be hosted in the Turkish city of Bursa and features 10 teams that play in a league format for the championship.

See also 

 Men's competitions
 EuroLeague
 EuroCup Basketball
 Basketball Champions League
 FIBA Europe Cup
 Women's competitions
 EuroLeague Women
 EuroCup Women
 SuperCup Women

Sources
European champions

References

External links
Basketball Champions League (official website)
FIBA (official website)

 
Champions League
Sports leagues established in 2016
2016 establishments in Europe
Multi-national professional sports leagues